This page lists proposed railway stations in England.

List of proposed stations in the South East

In London 
 Pickett's Lock
 New Bermondsey
 Burgess Park
 Old Kent Road

In Kent 
 Hoo

In Surrey 
 Guildford West
 Guildford East

In Sussex 

 Isfield - currently on the Lavender Line
 Barcombe Mills

List of proposed stations in Yorkshire

In connection with the possible electrification of the Harrogate Line

 Leeds/Bradford Airport railway station Parkway 
 Horsforth Woodside
 Cookridge
 Arthington Parkway (reopening)
 Buttersyke Bar – park and ride 
 Bilton
 Belmont
 Knaresborough East 
 Manse Farm
 Flaxby Moor
 Nether Poppleton 
 York Business Park
 Acomb

Other stations in West Yorkshire
 Manningham (reopening)
Crosshills
 Calverley
 Holbeck (reopening)
 Stourton
 Methley
 Haigh
 Crigglestone
 Luddendenfoot
 Greetland
 Elland (reopening)
 Hipperholme
 Norwood Green
 Bowling Park/West Bowling
 Laisterdyke
 Armley
 Cornholme
 Salterhebble
 Seacroft Hospital
 Thorpe Park
 East Leeds Parkway
 Osmondthorpe (reopening)
 East End Park
 Leeds East
 Elland Road/ Beeston
 East Ardsley
 Wrenthorpe
 Crofton
 Hemsworth
 White Rose Centre
 Ossett Parkway
 Horbury Bridge
 Thornhill Lees
 Golcar
 Earby

South Yorkshire
 Finningley, for Doncaster Sheffield airport

List of proposed stations in the West Midlands
 Rugby Parkway railway station
 Stockingford (reopening)
 Shrewsbury Parkway
 Weedon
Darlaston
Willenhall
Balsall Heath
Coventry East\Binley
Foleshill
Castle Bromwich
Tettenhall
Brinsford

In Birmingham
Moseley
Kings Heath
Stirchley

List of proposed stations in Cumbria 

 Keswick

List of proposed stations in the North East 

 Ashington
 Bedlington
 Blyth Bebside
 Newsham
 Seaton Delaval
Ferryhill
Gilsland
Team Valley

List of proposed stations in the West

In connection with the Devon Metro 

 Monkerton/Hill Barton
 Tavistock
 Cullompton
 Okehampton (East) Parkway
 Edginswell
 Marsh Barton

In connection with MetroWest (Bristol) 

 Saltford
 St Anne's Park
 Corsham
 Pill
 Ashton Gate
 Portishead
 Henbury
 North Filton
 Horfield
 Ashley Down
 Portway Parkway

Other stations in the West 

 Bristol Airport
Wellington
Instow
Bideford
Stonehouse Bristol Road

List of proposed stations in Anglia 

 Cambridge South
 Sawston
 Linton
 Granta Park
 Haverhill
 Addenbrooke's
 Cambridge Science Park
 Long Stretton
 Wisbech
Beaulieu

List of proposed stations in Lincolnshire 

 Deepings
 Donington
 Pinchbeck
 Washingborough/Heighington

See also 

 List of proposed railway stations in Scotland
 List of proposed railway stations in Wales

References 

Railway stations in England